Rhabdosargus thorpei, the bigeye stumpnose, is a fish endemic to South Africa between Port Alfred and Mozambique. The fish grows to 50 cm in length and can weigh up to 4 kg. The head and body are silvery while the middle of the body, anal and pelvic fins are yellow. They occur along beaches and on rocky reefs up to water 70 m deep.

References

External links 
 Coastal Fishes of Southern Africa. Phil & Elaine Heemstra. 2004. ISBN 1-920033-01-7
 http://www.fishbase.org/summary/Rhabdosargus-thorpei.html
 http://eol.org/pages/213638/overview 

thorpei
Fish described in 1979
Marine fish of South Africa